Heroism after Hours (German: Heldentum nach Ladenschluß) is a 1955 West German anthology comedy film directed by Wolfgang Becker, Erik Ode, Wolfgang Schleif and Fritz Stapenhorst and featuring an ensemble cast. It is in four parts each portraying a different tale of German soldiers attempting to get home at the end of the Second World War. It was shot at the Wandsbek Studios in Hamburg and on location around West Berlin, Bavaria and the Rhineland. The film's sets were designed by the art directors Wilhelm Vorwerg and Hans Berthel. The production company made a documentary the same year that also celebrated the ordinary German soldier.

Cast
 Josef Sieber as 	Richard Siewert (segment "Die schwaebische Eisenbahn")
 Horst Uhse as 	Willi (segment "Die schwaebische Eisenbahn")
 Herbert Weissbach as Der Sachse (segment "Die schwaebische Eisenbahn")
 Johannes Buzalski as Der Berliner (segment "Die schwaebische Eisenbahn")
 Charles Regnier as Zauberer Maro (segment "Der Zauberer Maro")
 Franz-Otto Krüger as Fink (segment "Der Zauberer Maro")
 Willi Rose as 	Gluckert (segment "Der Zauberer Maro")
 Serge Beloussow as (segment "Der Zauberer Maro")
 Oliver Hassencamp as Anton Hirsemenzel (segment "Romeo und Julia auf dem Tandem")
 Gerd Vespermann as 	Julius Dingelmann (segment "Romeo und Julia auf dem Tandem")
 Claudia Gerstäcker as Juliette (segment "Romeo und Julia auf dem Tandem")
 Harald Juhnke as Burmann (segment "Captain Fox")
 Rolf Weih as 	Richard (segment "Captain Fox")
 Wolfgang Wahl as 	Karl (segment "Captain Fox")
 Jo Herbst as 	(segment "Captain Fox")
 Klaus Herm as 	Paul Bauer (segment "Captain Fox")
 Werner Finck as 	Herr an der Litfasssaeule
 Hans Friedrich as 	Der Feine (segment "Die schwaebische Eisenbahn")
 Edward Tierney as Captain Fox (segment "Captain Fox")

References

Bibliography
 Giesen, Rolf. Nazi Propaganda Films: A History and Filmography. McFarland, 2003.
 Noack, Frank. Veit Harlan: The Life and Work of a Nazi Filmmaker. University Press of Kentucky, 2016.

External links 
 

1955 films
1955 comedy films
German comedy films
West German films
1950s German-language films
Films directed by Erik Ode
Films directed by Wolfgang Schleif
Films directed by Wolfgang Becker (director, born 1910)
1950s German films
Films set in 1945
Films shot in Bavaria
Films shot in Berlin
Films shot at Wandsbek Studios

de:Heldentum nach Ladenschluß